Ratapiko is a locality in Taranaki, New Zealand. Kaimata is about six kilometres to the north-west.

Lake Ratapiko is just to the south-east of the locality.

Demographics

Tarata had a population of 570 at the 2018 New Zealand census, a decrease of 12 people (−2.1%) since the 2013 census, and a decrease of 36 people (−5.9%) since the 2006 census. There were 210 households, comprising 312 males and 258 females, giving a sex ratio of 1.21 males per female. The median age was 35.7 years (compared with 37.4 years nationally), with 141 people (24.7%) aged under 15 years, 93 (16.3%) aged 15 to 29, 285 (50.0%) aged 30 to 64, and 45 (7.9%) aged 65 or older.

Ethnicities were 95.8% European/Pākehā, 13.7% Māori, 0.5% Pacific peoples, and 3.2% other ethnicities. People may identify with more than one ethnicity.

The percentage of people born overseas was 7.9, compared with 27.1% nationally.

Although some people chose not to answer the census's question about religious affiliation, 53.7% had no religion, 37.4% were Christian and 1.6% had other religions.

Of those at least 15 years old, 45 (10.5%) people had a bachelor's or higher degree, and 75 (17.5%) people had no formal qualifications. The median income was $35,100, compared with $31,800 nationally. 66 people (15.4%) earned over $70,000 compared to 17.2% nationally. The employment status of those at least 15 was that 267 (62.2%) people were employed full-time, 75 (17.5%) were part-time, and 18 (4.2%) were unemployed.

Marae

Te Upoko o te Whenua Marae and Ngārongo meeting house are a meeting place for Ngāti Maru.

In October 2020, the Government committed $500,000 from the Provincial Growth Fund to upgrade the marae, creating 15 jobs.

Education

Ratapiko School is a coeducational full primary (years 1–8) school with a roll of  students as of  The school was accepted as an Enviroschool in 2017.

Notes

Further reading

General historical works

School

Website 
School Website: www.ratapiko.schoolzone.net.nz

Populated places in Taranaki
New Plymouth District